or  is an island in Skjervøy Municipality in Troms og Finnmark county, Norway. The  island lies to the east of the island of Kågen and south of the island of Laukøya. The Kvænangen fjord lies to the east of the island. The village of Skjervøy is the main population centre on the island (and it is the administrative centre of the whole municipality). Fishing is one of the main industries on the island. Skjervøya is connected to the mainland by a bridge and then a tunnel. The Skjervøy Bridge connects the island to Kågen island to the west. The undersea Maursund Tunnel then connects Kågen to the mainland.

See also
 List of islands of Norway by area
 List of islands of Norway

References

Skjervøy
Islands of Troms og Finnmark